Elvankent railway station is a railway station in Ankara, Turkey. The station was a stop on the Ankara suburban from 1972 to 2016 when it was closed and demolished shortly after, in order to rebuild and expand the railway. Construction of the new station began in 2017 and opened on 12 April 2018.

Lale station was originally built in 1970 by the Turkish State Railways, when the railway from Ankara to Sincan was double-tracked. It entered service in 1972, when electric commuter service began on the line.

References

External links
TCDD Taşımacılık
EGO Genel Müdürlüğü

Railway stations in Ankara Province
Railway stations opened in 1972